Hariharpara is a village, with a police station, in the Hariharpara CD block in the Berhampore subdivision of Murshidabad district in the state of West Bengal, India.

Geography

Location

Area overview
The area shown in the map alongside, covering Berhampore and Kandi subdivisions, is spread across both the natural physiographic regions of the district, Rarh and Bagri. The headquarters of Murshidabad district, Berhampore, is in this area. The entire area is overwhelmingly rural with over 80% of the population living in the rural areas.

Note: The map alongside presents some of the notable locations in the subdivisions. All places marked in the map are linked in the larger full screen map.

Demographics
According to the 2011 Census of India, Hariharpara had a total population of 14,827, of which 7,570 (51%) were males and 7,257 (49%) were females. Population in the age range 0–6 years was 1,769. The total number of literate persons in Hariharpara was 9,894 (75.77% of the population over 6 years).

Civic administration

Police station
Hariharpara police station has jurisdiction over Hariharpara CD block.

CD block HQ
The headquarters of Hariharpara CD block are located at Hariharpara.

Transport
Baharampur-Amtala Road passes through Hariharpara.

Education
Hazi A.K. Khan College was established at Hariharpara in 2008. Affiliated with the University of Kalyani, it offers honours courses in Bengali, English, history and education.

Healthcare
The Block Primary Health Centre at Hariharpara functions with 20 beds.

Notable Person 
Niamot Sheikh, M.L.A of Hariharpara.

References

Villages in Murshidabad district